The Modest class of barges is a series of self-propelled fuel carrier watercraft being built by Modest Infrastructure Ltd in Bhavnagar, Gujarat, for the Indian Navy.

Description
They have capacity to carry 500 tons of fuel and have an air conditioned wheel house. The vessels are sea-going and have all of the essential communication and navigation equipment. They have been certified by IRS with Class notation : +SUL + IY., for carriage of oil with flash point above 60 Degree.

Specification
Gross weight	:731 tonnes
Net weight	:220 tonnes
Dead Weight	:625.7 tonnes
Displacement	:1152.01 tonnes
Light Weight	:526.31 tonnes
Overall Length	:57.35 m
Lbp		:54.8 m
Brdth Mlt	:11 m
Draught Max	:2.825 m
Engine Build	:CUMMINS INDIA LIMITED, KOTHRUD
Power		:1044 KW
Aux GEN	:2x 112 KW 415 V 50 Hz AC
Speed 		:12 knots

References

External links
http://www.newsreporter.in/oil-barge-inducted-into-navy
http://company.indiatradepage.com/143801/

Auxiliary ships of the Indian Navy
Ships of the Indian Navy
Auxiliary barge classes